Serhiy Reheda (born 6 February 1994) is a Ukrainian hammer thrower.

In age-specific categories he won the bronze medal at the 2011 World Youth Championships, finished ninth at the 2012 World Junior Championships and eighth at the 2015 European U23 Championships.

He finished seventh at the 2017 Universiade. He also competed at the 2016 European Championships, the 2017 World Championships and the 2018 European Championships without reaching the final.

His personal best throw is 76.92 metres, achieved in May 2017 in Kyiv.

References

1994 births
Living people
Ukrainian male hammer throwers
Athletes (track and field) at the 2010 Summer Youth Olympics
World Athletics Championships athletes for Ukraine
Competitors at the 2017 Summer Universiade
Universiade medalists in athletics (track and field)
Universiade silver medalists for Ukraine
21st-century Ukrainian people